The 2020–21 Albany Great Danes men's basketball team represented University at Albany, SUNY in the 2020–21 NCAA Division I men's basketball season. They played their home games at the SEFCU Arena in Albany, New York and were led by 20th-year head coach Will Brown. They finished the season 7–9, 6–6 in America East Play  to finish in fifth place. They lost in the quarterfinals of the America East tournament to Hartford. Following the season, Brown and Albany mutually agreed to part ways after 20 seasons.

Previous season
The Great Danes finished the 2019–20 season 14–18, 7–9 in America East play to finish in seventh place. They lost in the quarterfinals of the America East tournament to Stony Brook.

Roster

Schedule and results

|-
!colspan=12 style=| Regular season

|-
!colspan=12 style=| America East tournament
|-

Source

References

Albany Great Danes men's basketball seasons
Albany Great Danes
2020 in sports in New York (state)
2021 in sports in New York (state)